German submarine U-238 was a Type VIIC U-boat of Nazi Germany's Kriegsmarine built for service in the Second World War. She was laid down on 21 April 1942, by Germaniawerft of Kiel as yard number 668, launched on 7 January 1943 and commissioned on 20 February, with Oberleutnant zur See Horst Hepp in command. Hepp commanded her for her entire career, receiving promotion to Kapitänleutnant in the process.

Design
German Type VIIC submarines were preceded by the shorter Type VIIB submarines. U-238 had a displacement of  when at the surface and  while submerged. She had two shafts and two  propellers.

U-238 was fitted with five  torpedo tubes (four fitted at the bow and one at the stern), fourteen torpedoes, one  SK C/35 naval gun, 220 rounds, and two twin  C/30 anti-aircraft guns. The boat had a complement of between forty-four and sixty.

Service history
U-238 was a member of four wolfpacks; she was a successful, if short lived boat, sinking four freighters and damaging another during her operations against Allied convoys in the Battle of the Atlantic. She had the misfortune, however, of serving at the turning point of the war, when Allied countermeasures were taking a heavy toll on the U-boat force. She conducted three war patrols, beginning in September 1943, following her warm-up trials in the Baltic Sea.

War Patrols
U-238s first patrol was conducted from Trondheim in Norway as part of the 1st U-boat Flotilla, and entailed the submarine exiting the North Sea via the Denmark Strait and operating against Allied shipping in the so-called "air cover gap" in the Central Atlantic, where Allied aircraft had insufficient range to effectively operate against German U-boats. This first patrol was by far the most successful, as on 20 September 1943, the boat attacked a large convoy, sinking one 7,176 GRT cargo ship and damaging another. This was followed by three more victims on 23 September, when two Norwegian ships and a British freighter were sunk from the same convoy.

U-238s second patrol was less successful. Two weeks after leaving Brest, on the French Atlantic coast, she was attacked by a Grumman TBF Avenger torpedo bomber from the escort carrier , whose rockets killed two crew members and wounded five more, prompting the submarine to return to Brest with severe damage, which put her out of service for a month.

There were no survivors.

Wolfpacks
U-238 took part in four wolfpacks, namely:
 Leuthen (15 – 24 September 1943) 
 Schill 2 (17 – 22 November 1943) 
 Weddigen (22 November – 1 December 1943) 
 Igel 2 (4 – 9 February 1944)

Summary of raiding history

References

Bibliography

External links
 
 

1943 ships
German Type VIIC submarines
Maritime incidents in February 1944
Ships built in Kiel
Ships lost with all hands
U-boats commissioned in 1943
U-boats sunk by British warships
U-boats sunk by depth charges
U-boats sunk in 1944
World War II shipwrecks in the Atlantic Ocean
World War II submarines of Germany